The Center for Strategic and Budgetary Assessments (CSBA) is an independent, non-profit, Washington, D.C.-based think tank specializing in US defense policy, force planning, and budgets. It is headed by Thomas Mahnken. According to its website, CSBA's mission is "to promote innovative thinking and debate about national security strategy, defense planning and military investment options ... [and] to enable policymakers to make informed decisions in matters of strategy, security policy and resource allocation."

CSBA emphasizes initiatives the United States and its allies can take to wisely invest in the future, including during periods of fiscal austerity and uncertainty. CSBA evaluates its policy proposals through the net assessment methodology, wargaming, and by estimated impact on the Department of Defense budget over multiple Future Years Defense Programs.

Background
CSBA traces its origins to the Defense Budget Project, which was established by Gordon Adams in 1983 at the Center on Budget and Policy Priorities in order to "fill a vital information gap in the policy debate" during the Reagan Administration's defense buildup." In May 1995, the Center for Strategic and Budgetary Assessments was incorporated in its current form. Over the next two decades, CSBA played a prominent role in the debate over the revolution in military affairs (RMA) and the transformation of the US military.

Since September 11, 2001, CSBA has focused its analysis on linking near-term requirements to longer term challenges.  According to the group's website, CSBA "looks out two to three decades to identify emerging security challenges and opportunities." CSBA describes its current efforts as "drawing attention to a set of worrisome and profound emerging areas of concern: a rising China threat in the Pacific Theater; a nuclear-armed Iran; maintaining the US defense industrial base; and realigning the defense budget."  Over the past few years, CSBA has played a prominent role in the ongoing development of an AirSea Battle concept by the U.S. Air Force and Navy. Following cuts to U.S. defense spending and accelerating foreign military modernization, CSBA has also taken a lead role in highlighting the need to rebalance the Department of Defense's force structure and invest wisely for future challenges.

CSBA is a 501(c)(3) non-profit educational organization. The group's public education and research program is funded by grants and contributions from a range of foundations and corporations.  The majority of CSBA's income comes from research support under contract with the Department of Defense, its sub-agencies, the six branches, and the Defense Advanced Research Projects Agency (DARPA).

Staff
Notable key personnel employed by CSBA have included:
 Thomas G. Mahnken, President from 2016–present
Andrew Krepinevich, President from 1993 to 2016
 Eric S. Edelman, Distinguished Fellow, former Undersecretary of Defense for Policy (2005–2009), Ambassador to Turkey (2003–2005), Ambassador to Finland (1998–2001)

Notable alumni
 Robert O. Work, former Vice President for Strategic Studies, served as Deputy Secretary of Defense from May 2014 to July 2017.
 Michael G. Vickers, former Vice President for Strategic Studies, served as Undersecretary of Defense for Intelligence and Assistant Secretary of Defense for Special Operations and Low-Intensity Conflict.

Board of directors
Notable board members include:
 Barbara Humpton, Chair
Jack Keane
Paul J. Selva

Past notable board members have included:
 Nelson M. Ford
 Dave McCurdy

References

External links
 Center for Strategic and Budgetary Assessments official site
 Profile at SourceWatch

 
Foreign policy political advocacy groups in the United States
Foreign policy and strategy think tanks in the United States